HPQ may refer to:
 HPQ (record label)
 Harwich International railway station, in England
 History of Philosophy Quarterly
 Hominoid Personality Questionnaire
 HP Inc., an American technology company
 Hewlett-Packard, defunct American technology company and predecessor to HP Inc.